Coronidium is a genus of flowering plants in the family Asteraceae. The genus is endemic to Australia.

 Species

References

External links
 Atlas of Living Australia, Coronidium lanuginosum (A.Cunn. ex DC.) Paul G.Wilson 
 Plantnet New South Wales Flora Online, Coronidium elatum (A.Cunn. ex DC.) Paul G.Wilson 

Asteraceae genera
Endemic flora of Australia
 
Taxa named by Paul G. Wilson